Hadleigh is a town and former civil parish, now in the unparished area of Benfleet, in southeast Essex, England, on the A13 between Thundersley, Benfleet and Leigh-on-Sea with a population of 18,300. In 1951 the parish had a population of 5,209. It has a squared bypass to the north (the A127 'Southend Arterial Road').

History

Hadleigh is known for its castle, and the country park to the south of the town centre.  This gives its name to the local government district of Castle Point, with its extensive views overlooking the Thames Estuary.  Most of the facing stones were stripped from the castle in the 16th century – the only bits still visible today being high inside the surviving towers and a small section of the 'gate house' – so most of what remains today is the rubble infill that was packed between the outer facing stones. Despite this the skeletal remains are pleasing to the eye and have been considered a romantic ruin for a few hundred years. John Constable painted Hadleigh Castle in 1829. The painting now belongs to the Yale Center for British Art, and is on permanent display in its museum on the Yale campus.

Based on the previous census, writing in 1848, Samuel Lewis, summarised the facts of its history and economy as follows:
It had 366 inhabitants.
The Poor Law Union covering the area was Rochford
In the reign of Henry II of England a castle was built here by Hubert de Burgh, Earl of Kent, the remains are situated on the brow of a steep hill, and consist chiefly of two  circular towers. 
The living is a discharged rectory, valued in the king's books at £11. 14. 7.; net income, £450 [per year]; patrons, the Rector and Fellows of Lincoln College, Oxford. The church is an ancient structure, of which the eastern end is semicircular, and in the Norman style. A school is endowed with £781 three % consols.

In the 19th century, Hadleigh was the home of the cunning man James Murrell. He died in the town in December 1860.

The town has never had a railway station and almost all of its architecture is late 19th and 20th century – only three buildings are listed but one of these is the church, which is Grade I listed.

Landmarks
The castle ruins are set at the top of a hill overlooking the Thames Estuary, and the Canary Wharf development nearly 30 miles to the west can be seen when visibility is adequate. Another building of note is the Church of St James the Less which was believed to be Norman but is now known to be Saxon because of its general dimensions, window alignments, Saxon Romanesque arches, pagan Saxon puddingstone inclusions and the pagan Saxon "fairy wheel" motif carved into the wall by the north door. The church remains picturesque and its neighbouring street layout resembles St Clement Danes in that it stands in the middle of a bustling high street. However, it has a considerably larger churchyard.

Salvation Army Farm Colony

The colony was established in Hadleigh in 1891 by William Booth, a preacher who founded the Salvation Army Christian organisation. He believed every human being should have food and shelter and published a plan to rescue the destitute from the squalor of London. His vision was that the poor would be given board and lodgings in a City Colony in exchange for a day's work. They could then move to a Farm Colony where they would be trained to work the land and run their own smallholdings. Then finally they could progress to Overseas Colonies, running smallholdings abroad.

The trial City Colony was set up in Whitechapel in 1889 and two years later Booth put down a deposit on land in Hadleigh for his Farm Colony.
Existing farm buildings were renovated and new dormitories, a bathhouse, laundry, reading room, hospital and religious meeting house were built. As well as farming and market gardening, colonists were taught brickmaking, pottery and construction skills.
Today the colony operates an employment training centre for people who have special training needs, and accepts referrals from Social Services and the Employment Service. The aim is to create a realistic working environment, with the intention of helping clients gain the skills necessary for work elsewhere. Employment at the training centre – reminiscent of the colony's origins – includes horticulture, carpentry, catering, office skills and estate management.

Governance
On 1 April 1974 as a result of the Local Government Act 1972, Hadleigh parish was abolished and, along with Canvey Island, South Benfleet, and Thundersley has formed the local government district and borough of Castle Point. As of the 2010 general election, the Member of Parliament representing the parliamentary constituency of Castle Point (created in 1983) is Rebecca Harris of the Conservative Party.

Hadleigh elects 1 seat to Essex County Council. As of 2009, the seat is held by Jillian Reeves of the Conservative Party. Within Castle Point Borough Council, Hadleigh is represented by six councillors elected from the two wards of St James and Victoria.

Sport
Leigh Town Football Club in the Essex Olympian Football League play at John Burrows which also the site of Hadleigh and Thundersley Cricket Club.

It was announced in August 2008 that Hadleigh Farm (including the area around the castle) would host the London 2012 Olympic mountain biking events.
The actual event took place on Saturday 11th and Sunday 12 August.

Gallery

See also
Hadleigh Bus Depot

References

External links

 Local Hadleigh Website & Directory
 The Hadleigh & Thundersley Community Archive

 
Towns in Essex
Populated coastal places in Essex
Former civil parishes in Essex
Castle Point